Shaka Felton Toney (born January 8, 1998) is an American football defensive end for the Washington Commanders of the National Football League (NFL). He played college football at Penn State and was drafted by Washington in the seventh round of the 2021 NFL Draft.

Early life and high school
Toney was born on January 8, 1998, in Philadelphia, Pennsylvania and attended Imhotep Institute Charter High School. As a senior he was named the Pennsylvania Football News Class AAA Defensive Player of the Year and first-team All-State after recording 97 tackles and 21 sacks.

College career
At Penn State, Toney redshirted his true freshman season. As a redshirt freshman Toney recorded 20 tackles with 6.5 tackles for loss and four sacks with two forced fumbles and was named to the Big Ten Network's All-Freshman team. He finished his redshirt sophomore season with 7.5 tackles for loss and five sacks. Toney was named second-team All-Big Ten Conference after making 41 tackles with eight tackles for loss and 6.5 sacks.

Professional career

Toney was drafted by the Washington Commanders in the seventh round (246th overall) of the 2021 NFL Draft. He signed his four-year rookie contract on May 13, 2021. In Week 12, Toney recorded his first career sack in a 17-15 Washington victory on Monday Night Football.

References

External links

Washington Commanders bio
Penn State Nittany Lions bio

1998 births
Living people
Players of American football from Philadelphia
American football defensive ends
Penn State Nittany Lions football players
Washington Commanders players
Washington Football Team players